St John's Church was an Anglican parish church in St Hubert's Road, Great Harwood, Lancashire, England.  Its benefice has been united with that of St Bartholomew, Great Harwood.

History

St John's Church originated as a mission church in the Old Butts Chapel in 1881.  In 1898 a new church was built, and in 1908 St John's became a separate parish. It was decided to build a new church, the foundation stone of which was laid on 27 May 1911.  It was designed by the architects Austin and Paley of Lancaster.  The new church was consecrated on 1 October 1912 by the Rt Revd Edmund Knox, bishop of Manchester.  There had been plans to build a west tower but, when the funds were raised for this in the 1950s, it was discovered that the foundations were inadequate, and a new northwest porch was built instead.  This was opened in 1961.  The church was declared redundant on 1 March 2006, and was demolished in 2009.  Its reredos was moved to St Margaret's Church, Oldham.

Architecture

The church was constructed in stone, its architectural style being late Perpendicular.  The authors of the Buildings of England series describe it as having been "handsome and assured with well-grouped elements", and having a "good if sober interior".

See also

List of ecclesiastical works by Austin and Paley (1895–1914)

References

Churches completed in 1912
Austin and Paley buildings
Gothic Revival church buildings in England
Gothic Revival architecture in Lancashire
Great Harwood
Former churches in Lancashire
Buildings and structures in Hyndburn
1912 establishments in England